The following is a list of notable deaths in June 1990.

Entries for each day are listed alphabetically by surname. A typical entry lists information in the following sequence:
 Name, age, country of citizenship at birth, subsequent country of citizenship (if applicable), reason for notability, cause of death (if known), and reference.

June 1990

1
Eric Barker, 78, English actor (Carry On).
Wilhelm Borchert, 83, German actor.
Dow Hover, 89, American executioner, suicide by carbon monoxide poisoning.
Wieslaw Kielar, 70, Polish filmmaker and author.

2
Claude Chabauty, 80, French mathematician.
Walter Davis, 57, American pianist, liver and kidney disease.
Rex Harrison, 82, English actor (My Fair Lady), pancreatic cancer.
Shriram Sharma, 78, Indian author and freedom fighter.

3
Tom Brown, 77, American actor, lung cancer.
Robert Noyce, 62, American physicist and entrepreneur (Intel), heart attack.
Richard Sohl, 37, American musician, heart attack.
Juan Rovira Tarazona, 60, Spanish politician.
Aino Taube, 77, Swedish actress.

4
Stiv Bators, 40, American punk rock vocalist and guitarist, traffic collision.
Yulian Bromley, 69, Soviet anthropologist.
Robert Edwards, 85, British politician.
Jack Gilford, 81, American actor (Save the Tiger), stomach cancer.
Ivor Raymonde, 63, British musician.

5
Abdul Aziz, 77, Sri Lankan politician.
Luís Viana Filho, 82, Brazilian politician.
Jim Hodder, 42, American drummer (Steely Dan), drowned.
Vasili Kuznetsov, 89, Soviet politician, acting chairman (1982–1983, 1984, 1985).
Peter Throckmorton, 61, American archaeologist and photojournalist.

6
Albert Alderman, 82, English cricketer and footballer.
Aurora de Albornoz, 64, Spanish academic, cerebral hemorrhage.
Mato Dukovac, 71, Yugoslav flying ace during World War II .
Marcel Grignon, 75, French cinematographer.
Sobir Kamolov, 80, Soviet politician.
Butch Lindley, 42, American racing driver, racing accident.
Joe Loss, 80, British musician.
Fyodor Remezov, 93, Soviet general.

7
Robert Perceval Armitage, 83, British colonial administrator.
Barbara Baxley, 67, American actress and singer, heart attack.
Lou Blackburn, 67, American trombonist.
Mary Katherine Campbell, 84, American beauty pageant contestant.
Alfredo Poveda, 64, Ecuadorian politician, interim president (1976–1979), heart attack.
Moh Yoon-sook, 80, South Korean poet.
Petar Šegvić, 59, Yugoslav Olympic rower (1952).

8
José Figueres Ferrer, 83, Costa Rican politician, president (1948–1949, 1953–1958, 1970–1974).
Herbie Matthews, 76, Australian rules football player.
Neb Stewart, 72, American baseball player.
Remy Van Lierde, 74, Belgian flying ace during World War II.

9
Asad Bhopali, 68, Indian lyricist and poet.
James Carreras, 81, British film producer.
C.P. de Cumont, 88, Belgian general.
Eric Fletcher, Baron Fletcher, 87, British politician.
John Holland, 63, New Zealand hurdler, cancer.
Angus McBean, 86, Welsh photographer.

10
Russel Carrero, 39, Nicaraguan Olympic sprinter (1972).
Ludvig Holm-Olsen, 76, Norwegian linguist.
Hanna Olsen, 100, Swedish Olympic fencer (1924, 1928).
Hubert Rostaing, 71, French musician.

11
Vicente Aguirre, 89, Argentine football player.
Irakly Andronikov, 81, Soviet and Russian literature historian and media personality.
Seosamh Mac Grianna, 89, Irish writer.
Bram Kool, 53, Dutch racing cyclist.
John H. Manley, 82, American nuclear physicist (Manhattan Project).
Clyde McCoy, 86, American trumpeter, Alzheimer's disease.
Oldřich Nejedlý, 80, Czechoslovak footballer.
Bert Norris, 91, English Olympic runner (1936).
Joan Stevens, 81, New Zealand academic.
Isaac D. White, 89, American general.
Vaso Čubrilović, 93, Yugoslav scholar and politician.

12
Solomon Freehof, 97, British-American rabbi and scholar.
Moushegh Ishkhan, 77, Armenian diasporan poet, writer and educator.
Fuyuhiko Kitagawa, 89, Japanese poet and film critic.
Gerald Marchesi, 61, Italian-Australian football player.
Georg Meistermann, 78, German painter.
Terence O'Neill, 75, Northern Irish politician, prime minister (1963–1969), cancer.
Billy Taylor, 71, Canadian ice hockey player.
Jim Walkup, 94, American baseball player.
Willy Ørskov, 69, Danish sculptor.

13
Antony Andrewes, 80, English historian.
Barbara Claßen, 32, German Olympic judoka (1988), suicide.
Gidsken Jakobsen, 81, Norwegian aviator.
Ra'ana Liaquat Ali Khan, 85, Pakistani politician, first lady (1947–1951).
Michiyo Kogure, 72, Japanese actress.
Frank McGuren, 80, Australian politician.
Thomas Ponsonby, 3rd Baron Ponsonby of Shulbrede, 59, British politician.

14
Erna Berger, 89, German singer.
Ted Buckle, 65, English football player.
Jay Gorney, 93, American songwriter.
Ralf Liivar, 87, Soviet football player.
Chet McNabb, 69, American basketball player.
Roy Nutt, 59, American computer engineer, lung cancer.
Jean-François Pintat, 66, French politician.
Heinrich Reinhardt, 87, German-Argentine chess player.

15
Nobuo Arai, 80–81, Japanese Olympic swimmer (1928).
St. Clair Drake, 79, American sociologist.
Raymond Huntley, 86, English actor.
Cynthia Irwin-Williams, 54, American archaeologist.
Bucky Jacobs, 77, American baseball player.
George Nakashima, 85, American furniture designer.
Leonard Sachs, 80, South African-British actor, kidney failure.

16
Herman S. Bloch, 78, American chemist, heart attack.
Thomas George Cowling, 83, English astronomer.
Dennis Dyer, 76, South African cricket player.
Megan Leigh, 26, American pornographic actress, suicide by gunshot.
Jack K. McFall, 84, American diplomat.
Feliciano Monti, 87, Italian footballer.
Eva Turner, 98, English singer.
Ruedi Walter, 73, Swiss actor and comedian, complications from surgery.

17
Konrad Bauer, 71, German flying ace during World War II.
Henry T. Bream, 90, American baseball player.
Dick Elffers, 79, Dutch artist.
Paul Giovanni, 57, American playwright and composer, AIDS.
Bob Hamerton, 79, Canadian Olympic swimmer (1936).
Aleksandrs Leimanis, 76, Soviet film director.
Francisco Solano Patiño, 66–67, Paraguayan football player.
Ronald F. Tylecote, 74, British archaeologist.

18
Barbara Cason, 61, American actress, heart attack.
Henryk Leliwa-Roycewicz, 91, Polish Olympic equestrian (1936).
Ronald Lewis, 80, British politician.
Rolf Stranger, 99, Norwegian politician.
Barbra Walz, 39, American fashion photographer, breast cancer.

19
Isabella Smith Andrews, 84, Scottish-born New Zealand playwright.
Charles R. Farnsley, 83, American politician, member of the U.S. House of Representatives (1965–1967), Alzheimer's disease.
Aleksandr Goncharov, 31, Soviet field hockey player and Olympian.
Steen Eiler Rasmussen, 92, Danish architect.
Karel Sys, 76, Belgian boxer.
Bill Westwick, 81, Canadian sports journalist.
G. Yogasangari, Sri Lankan politician, shot.

20
Ina Balin, 52, American actress, pulmonary hypertension.
Tom Hopkinson, 85, British journalist.
Levin Kipnis, 95, Russian-Israeli author.
James Nguyễn Ngọc Quang, 80, Vietnamese Roman Catholic prelate, bishop of Cần Thơ (1965–1990).
Kōsaku Yosida, 81, Japanese mathematician.

21
Cedric Belfrage, 85, English journalist.
June Christy, 64, American singer, kidney failure.
Eliahu Eilat, 86, Soviet-Israeli diplomat.
Ross Munro, 76, Canadian war correspondent during World War II.
Tony Sarausky, 77, American football player.
Margaret J. Winkler, 95, American animation producer.
Zheng Yanfen, 88, Taiwanese politician, cerebral hemorrhage.

22
Ilya Frank, 81, Soviet nuclear physicist, Nobel Prize recipient (1958).
Elizabeth Harwood, 52, English singer, cancer.
Binod Kanungo, 78, Indian author, freedom fighter, and encyclopedia compiler.
Joseph Murumbi, 79, Kenyan politician.
Sabeena Rafi, 71, Indian literary critic.

23
Harindranath Chattopadhyay, 92, Indian politician, actor and playwright, cardiac arrest.
Frank Gatliff, 62, Australian-English actor.
Wim Kat, 85, Dutch Olympic runner (1924).
Ellis Marcus, 72, American television writer, heart attack.
Hermann Rahn, 77, American physiologist.
Matthew Ward, 39, American translator, AIDS.

24
Germán Suárez Flamerich, 83, Venezuelan politician, president (1950–1952).
Sean Hughes, 44, British history teacher and politician, cancer.
William Kneale, 84, English logician.
Paul Lindemann, 72, American basketball player, Goodpasture syndrome.

25
Jorge Alcalde, 73, Peruvian footballer.
Bizunesh Bekele, 53–54, Ethiopian singer.
Sydney Boehm, 82, American filmmaker, pneumonia.
Robert Carney, 95, American naval admiral, cardiac arrest.
Peggy Glanville-Hicks, 77, Australian composer.
Melba Roy Mouton, 61, American mathematician, brain cancer.
Yevgeniya Sechenova, 71, Soviet Olympic runner (1952).
Ronald Gene Simmons, 49, American convicted spree killer, execution by lethal injection.
John Stoll, 76, British art director.

26
Anni Blomqvist, 80, Finnish-Swedish novelist.
Albert Byrd, 74, American racing cyclist.
Doc Kauffman, 1989, German-American electric guitar engineer.
Wolfe Kelman, 66, Austrian-American rabbi, melanoma.
J. C. R. Licklider, 75, American computer scientist, asthma.
Manuel de Pedrolo i Molina, 72, Spanish author of novels, short stories, poetry and plays, cancer.
Carroll Ringwalt, 82, American football player.
Hans Schwerdtfeger, 87, German-Canadian-Australian mathematician.
Sidney Smith, 82, English snooker player.
Glen Milton Storr, 68, Australian zoologist.

27
Olav Benum, 92, Norwegian politician.
Lambert Anthony Hoch, 87, American Roman Catholic prelate.
José Marrone, 74, Argentine actor, cardiovascular disease.
José Clemente Maurer, 90, German Cardinal of the Roman Catholic Church.
Joe O'Rourke, 85, American baseball player.
Gilberto Román, 28, Mexican boxer, traffic collision.

28
Juan Friede Alter, 89, Ukrainian-Colombian historian of Jewish descent.
Per Bergersen, 29, Norwegian musician, assisted suicide by gunshot.
Borys Ivchenko, 49, Ukrainian actor and film director.
Herbert Jobst, 74, German writer.

29
Dick Barton, 78, South African boxer and Olympian.
René Boël, 91, Belgian industrialist.
Boyd Perry, 76, American baseball player.
Irving Wallace, 74, American novelist, pancreatic cancer.

30
Lynne Carol, 76, British actress, heart attack.
Marquis Childs, 87, American journalist, cardiovascular disease.
Miguel Cuenco, 85, Filipino politician.
Eli Whitney Debevoise, 90, American lawyer.
Dudu Pukwana, 51, South African musician, liver failure.
Brian Tiler, 47, English footballer and football executive, traffic collision.

References 

1990-06
 06